Daniel Percheron (born 31 August 1942 in Beauvais, Oise) is a French politician who has served in the Senate of France, representing the Pas-de-Calais department, since 1983. He is a member of the Socialist Party, and was president of the Regional Council of Nord-Pas-de-Calais.

References
Page on the Senate website

1942 births
Living people
People from Beauvais
Politicians from Hauts-de-France
Socialist Party (France) politicians
French Senators of the Fifth Republic
Senators of Pas-de-Calais